Robert Manuel Oramas Brizuela (born Guatire, 9 June 1984) is a Venezuelan volleyball player. He competed in the 2020 Summer Olympics.

References

1984 births
Living people
Sportspeople from Caracas
Volleyball players at the 2020 Summer Olympics
Venezuelan men's volleyball players
Olympic volleyball players of Venezuela
21st-century Venezuelan people